Folly Farm is an Arts and Crafts style country house in Sulhamstead, West Berkshire, England. It is a Grade I listed building. The gardens, designed by Lutyens and Gertrude Jekyll, are Grade II* listed in the National Register of Historic Parks and Gardens. They are among the best-known gardens of the Lutyens/Jekyll partnership.

House

Around 1906, Lutyens extended the 17th-century, timbered cottage for H. H. Cochrane, using grey brick dressed with red brick and ashlar, in William and Mary style. The addition is H-shaped. The interior of the H's centre, which aligns east–west, is occupied by a two-storey, neoclassical style hall, which Lutyens painted black. The original cottage, which Lutyens connected to the northwest corner of the new house, became a service wing.

Around 1912, Lutyens created the vernacular addition for new owners of the house, Zachary Merton and his wife Antonie, who had both divorced from their former spouses to marry each other. Zachary Merton (born Zachary Moses) was a businessman and philanthropist. His family had founded Metallgesellschaft in Germany and Henry R. Merton and Co. in Britain, which were among the leading metal trading companies of their respective countries. Merton was a director and one of the largest shareholders of the British company. Antonie had come to England from Germany with her previous husband, Hermann Schmiechen, a portrait painter. She was a follower of theosophy, like Lutyens's wife Emily.

Lutyens built the vernacular addition in red brick, with tile-hanging and weatherboarding. The west wing's south end features a large bay window on each floor. At ground level, the south end contains a neoclassical dining room with a huge fireplace, as high as the room. Above the dining room, the main bedroom has a sleeping balcony (for outside sleeping), built over arches, on its west side. On the east side, there is an L-shaped cloister with buttressed arches running alongside the dining room and along the south side of the connecting corridor, bordering two sides of the Tank Court and its rectangular pool.

The service quarters moved to the new wing, with a circular dairy attached to its northern end. The original cottage became a billiard room.

Zachary Merton died in 1915. Antonie Merton allowed Lutyens and his family to spend the summer of 1916 at Folly Farm, where they entertained Jekyll, the playwright Edward Knoblock and the painters William Nicholson and his wife Mabel Pryde. Nicholson painted a mural in the dining room during his stay.

During World War II, the house served as a maternity hospital, then reverted to private ownership. The British celebrity cook Keith Floyd (1942 - 2009) was born at Folly Farm on 28 December 1943.

Gardens

The formal gardens extend to the south and west of the house, with lawns beyond.

In 1906, Lutyens and Jekyll turned the area around the original cottage and its barn into a series of walled courts. To the south of the house, they created a walled kitchen garden and a rhododendron walk. The latter, running south along the eastern side of the gardens, has subsequently been replaced by a lime walk leading to a White Garden.

In 1912 they placed a canal garden, with a long rectangular pool, to the south of the earlier William and Mary addition. Between the new west wing and the kitchen garden, they positioned a parterre garden, and to the west of that, a sunken rose garden. Tank Court, with its cloister and pool, has been called "probably Lutyens's  in garden architecture".

Notes

References

External links

Folly Farm visit by The Lutyens Trust

Arts and Crafts architecture in England
Grade I listed buildings in Berkshire
Grade I listed houses
Country houses in Berkshire
Houses completed in 1912
Works of Edwin Lutyens in England
Grade II* listed parks and gardens in Berkshire
Arts and Crafts gardens
Gardens by Gertrude Jekyll